is a Japanese professional sumo wrestler from Kōfu, Yamanashi Prefecture. He made his professional debut in March 2006 and first reached the top makuuchi division in January 2018. Ryūden has won a championship in every division except makuuchi and has earned two special prizes, one for Fighting Spirit and one for Technique. His highest rank has been komusubi. He is a member of Takadagawa stable.

Career
He was the youngest of three brothers and had a background in judo. However, he was persuaded by the former sekiwake Akinoshima, a coach at Takadagawa stable who was visiting his junior high school to scout a judo classmate, to give sumo a try. He made his debut in March 2006, the same tournament as Tochinoshin, Sakaizawa and Masakaze. He was immediately given the shikona of Ryūden, with the "Ryū" part taken from his hometown school and the "den" part from the legendary wrestler Raiden. He was talked of, alongside Masunoyama, as a candidate for the first wrestler born in the Heisei era to reach the sekitori ranks when he produced a 5–2 score at the rank of makushita 15 in November 2009. However his progress then stalled with two consecutive make-koshi, and he suffered a concussion after falling from the dohyo in a match against Takanoiwa in March 2010, and was embarrassed when he had to be carried off in a wheelchair. He was overtaken by Takayasu who did become the first Heisei born sekitori in November 2010, with Masunoyama. However after scoring a perfect 7–0 record and taking the makushita championship, Ryūden eventually reached the jūryō division himself after the  September 2012 tournament. He was the first sekitori produced by the new Takadagawa head Akinoshima, who had taken over the running of the stable from former ōzeki Maenoyama in 2009. He was also the first sekitori from Yamanashi Prefecture since Hidenohana 24 years earlier.

However Ryūden suffered a fracture of his right hip joint in his juryo debut in November and had to withdraw from the tournament. During his long injury recuperation he made two abortive attempts to return, breaking the hip twice more. This resulted in him falling all the way down to jonokuchi 17 in the rankings. For four consecutive tournaments from January until July 2014, although still injured, he fought (and won) one match at the end of the tournament, solely to prevent falling off the banzuke completely. He was finally fit to return in September 2014 and won three consecutive yusho to quickly return to the third highest makushita division. He was finally promoted back to jūryō in November 2016. Only Hokutokuni (off the banzuke) and Kotobeppu (jonokuchi 39) had returned to jūryō from lower ranks than Ryūden had.

Ryūden was promoted to the top makuuchi division in January 2018, becoming the second top division wrestler from Takadagawa stable after Kagayaki to achieve this since the new head coach took over. He was the first Yamanashi Prefecture native to be ranked in makuuchi since Onohana in March 1988. He scored ten wins in his top division debut and shared the Fighting Spirit prize with fellow newcomer Abi. Since then, he has stayed in makuuchi and has mainly shown solid performances. In May 2019 he won ten bouts and received his first Technique prize. He was promoted to komusubi for the July 2019 tournament, the first from Yamanashi Prefecture since Fujizakura 47 years earlier. He scored only 4–11 in his komusubi debut, and remained in the mid-maegashira ranks until May 2021, where he fell to maegashira 14. He was withdrawn from that tournament by his stablemaster, who said he had breached COVID-19 compliance guidelines. Ryūden was later suspended for three tournaments retroactive to the May basho; he was eligible to compete again in November. The compliance committee set up by the Sumo Association to investigate the matter found that on 25 different occasions between March 12, 2020 and January 20, 2021, he had gone out with a woman who was not his wife, breaking the rules on unnecessary trips.

When Ryūden competed again after his suspension in November 2021, he won the makushita division title with a perfect 7-0 record. A 6-1 record in the following basho earned Ryūden a return to jūryō for the March 2022 tournament.

Fighting style
Ryūden is a yotsu sumo specialist who prefers grappling techniques. His favourite winning kimarite is yori-kiri, with a moro-zashi hold, or both arms inside his opponent's.

Career record

See also
List of sumo tournament second division champions
List of active sumo wrestlers
List of komusubi
Active special prize winners

References

External links

1990 births
Living people
Japanese sumo wrestlers
Sumo people from Yamanashi Prefecture